Contrast bath therapy, is a form of treatment where a limb or the entire body is immersed in hot (but not boiling) water followed by the immediate immersion of the limb or body in cold ice water. This procedure is repeated several times, alternating hot and cold. The only evidence of benefit is anecdotal and no plausible mechanism has been confirmed.

Theory
The theory behind contrast bath therapy is that the hot water causes vasodilation of the blood flow in the limb or body followed by the cold water which causes vasoconstriction, increasing local blood circulation. Additionally, the lymph vessels contract when exposed to cold, and relax in response to heat. The lymph system, unlike the circulatory system, lacks a central pump. By alternating hot and cold, it is believed that lymph vessels dilate and contract to "pump" and move stagnant fluid out of the injured area and that this positively affects the inflammation process, which is the body's primary mechanism for healing damaged tissue.
One study showed that fluctuations in intramuscular temperature were lower than those caused by a hot bath alone.

Other studies indicate that thermal stress seems to positively influence the immune system.

A pair of studies published in 1994 and 1997 by William Myer and colleagues at Brigham Young University investigated this claim using needle-mounted thermometers placed just under the skin and 1 cm deep into the calf muscle. In both studies the subjects underwent a 20-minute contrast routine, starting with heat and alternating with cold every four minutes. The 1994 study used two whirlpool baths, while the 1997 study used hot packs and ice bags. In both cases, Myer et al. found that, while the contrast therapy caused fluctuations in skin temperature, muscular temperatures did not change significantly during the contrast therapy. The body likely was able to divert blood flow so that the deep muscle temperature was maintained at a fairly constant level. Having this assumption about contrast therapy overturned forced researchers to look for other possible mechanisms.

Treatment
Contrast bathing can be used to reduce swelling around injuries or to aid recovery from exercise. It can also significantly improve muscle recovery following exercise by reducing the levels of blood lactate concentration.
For any injury presenting with palpable swelling and heat, and visible redness - such as a strain/sprain - contrast baths are contraindicated during the acute inflammation stage. Acute inflammation begins at the time of injury and lasts for approximately 72 hours.

Effectiveness in athletic recovery
The current evidence base suggests that contrast water therapy (CWT) is superior to using passive recovery or rest after exercise; the magnitudes of these effects may be most relevant to an elite sporting population. There seems to be little difference in recovery outcome between CWT and other popular recovery interventions such as cold water immersion and active recovery.

In a review on immersion therapy in general, Ian Wilcock, John Cronin, and Wayne Hing suggest that most of the benefits of contrast therapy are from the hydrostatic pressure from the water, not the variations in temperature.

See also
Ice bath

References

 https://web.archive.org/web/20080511172155/http://www.pponline.co.uk/encyc/injury-recovery-and-conditioning

Physical therapy